Nishikata may refer to:

Nishikata, Tochigi, a former town in Kamitsuga District, Tochigi Prefecture, Japan
Nishikata Station, a railway station in Satsumasendai, Kumamoto Prefecture, Japan

People with the surname
, Japanese ski jumper
, Japanese actress and television personality

Fictional characters
, protagonist of the manga series Teasing Master Takagi-san

Japanese-language surnames